Tiphia bijui is a species of wasp belonging to the family Tiphiidae, subfamily Tiphiinae.The species is named after an expert field assistant Mr. T. Biju, a Forest watcher at Aralam Wildlife Sanctuary.

Distribution and habitat 
It is observed in Goa, Karnataka, Kerala, Tamil Nadu, Uttarakhand, West Bengal.

Description 
Color is generally black with lower part and outer margin of tegula yellowish brown and mandible dark brown.

References 

Tiphiidae